The London Press Exchange was founded in 1892 by Frederick Higginbottom and Reginald J.Sykes, becoming a significant Government advertising agency during World War II. It merged with the Leo Burnett agency in 1969.

The agency also produced promotional work for the 1921 film Elsie and the Brown Bunny, and advertising posters for the 1951 Festival of Britain.

On 5 November 1946, the Market Research Society was created in the London Press Exchange offices.

Notable people
Frederick Higginbottom (1859 - 1943) co-founder
 Keith Lucas (d.2012) who became director of the British Film Institute
 William Stewart (b. 1886 Greenwich), Director
Howard Thomas (1909—1986) worked in the commercial radio section
 Mark Abrams (1906-1994) led its research function in the 1930s doing ground breaking studies Mark Abrams

Bibliography
London Press Exchange at the National Archives
"Visit of The Institute to the London Press Exchange Limited", Journal of the Royal Statistical Society, Series D (The Statistician), Vol. 13, No. 1 (1963), pp. 47–53, Published by Wiley-Blackwell
 Material at the Museum of London
 "A Letter from the London Press Exchange", bbc.co.uk, retrieved 17 August 2012
 London Press Exchange at Google News archives

References

Mass media companies established in 1892
Defunct marketing companies of the United Kingdom
Business services companies established in 1892
Mass media companies disestablished in 1969
1892 establishments in England
1969 disestablishments in England